Ferenc Fodor (born 22 March 1991) is a Hungarian football player who plays for Győri ETO.

Club career
On 16 June 2021 Fodor signed a two-year contract with Győri ETO.

Career statistics

References

External links
Profile at HLSZ

1991 births
Living people
Sportspeople from Pécs
Hungarian footballers
Hungary youth international footballers
Hungary under-21 international footballers
Association football defenders
Oldham Athletic A.F.C. players
Northwich Victoria F.C. players
Pécsi MFC players
Kozármisleny SE footballers
Nyíregyháza Spartacus FC players
Puskás Akadémia FC players
Kisvárda FC players
Győri ETO FC players
Nemzeti Bajnokság I players
Nemzeti Bajnokság II players
Hungarian expatriate footballers
Expatriate footballers in England
Hungarian expatriate sportspeople in England